Hillsdale is a borough in the northern portion of Bergen County, in the U.S. state of New Jersey, within the New York City metropolitan area. As of the 2020 United States census, the borough's population was 10,143, a decrease of 76 (−0.7%) from the 2010 census count of 10,219, which in turn reflected an increase of 132 (+1.3%) from the 10,087 counted at the 2000 census.

The populated area today known as Hillsdale took form in the mid-to-late 19th century as land speculators, led by David P. Patterson, developed subdivisions to profit from the coming of the Hackensack and New York Railroad (later New Jersey and New York Railroad). The area was incorporated as Hillsdale Township on March 25, 1898, from portions of Washington Township, which had, in turn, been set off from Harrington Township in 1840. Portions of the township were taken on April 30, 1906, to create the township of River Vale. Hillsdale was reincorporated as a borough by an act of the New Jersey Legislature on March 2, 1923, subject to approval which came in a referendum held on April 24, 1923. The borough's name derives from its location in a "dale among the hills".

Geography
According to the United States Census Bureau, the borough had a total area of 2.94 square miles (7.61 km2), including 2.90 square miles (7.52 km2) of land and 0.04 square miles (0.09 km2) of water (1.19%).

A small portion of Woodcliff Lake Reservoir lies inside the borough, at the southeast end of the reservoir, with Church Road following along the southern end of the spillway.

The borough borders Ho-Ho-Kus, Park Ridge, River Vale, Saddle River, Washington Township, Westwood and Woodcliff Lake.

Hillsdale Manor is an unincorporated community located within Hillsdale.

Demographics

2010 census

The Census Bureau's 2006–2010 American Community Survey showed that (in 2010 inflation-adjusted dollars) median household income was $116,021 (with a margin of error of +/− $6,848) and the median family income was $132,340 (+/− $8,841). Males had a median income of $91,250 (+/− $6,943) versus $53,190 (+/− $11,522) for females. The per capita income for the borough was $45,549 (+/− $2,679). About 1.4% of families and 3.0% of the population were below the poverty line, including 4.0% of those under age 18 and 2.9% of those age 65 or over.

2000 census
As of the 2000 United States census there were 10,087 people, 3,502 households, and 2,850 families residing in the borough. The population density was 3,383.2 people per square mile (1,306.9/km2). There were 3,547 housing units at an average density of 1,189.7 per square mile (459.6/km2). The racial makeup of the borough was 92.41% White, 0.85% African American, 0.07% Native American, 5.08% Asian, 0.04% Pacific Islander, 0.86% from other races, and 0.69% from two or more races. Hispanic or Latino of any race were 4.25% of the population.

There were 3,502 households, out of which 38.1% had children under the age of 18 living with them, 70.8% were married couples living together, 7.7% had a female householder with no husband present, and 18.6% were non-families. 15.7% of all households were made up of individuals, and 8.8% had someone living alone who was 65 years of age or older. The average household size was 2.87 and the average family size was 3.20.

In the borough the population was spread out, with 26.0% under the age of 18, 5.1% from 18 to 24, 29.0% from 25 to 44, 25.1% from 45 to 64, and 14.8% who were 65 years of age or older. The median age was 40 years. For every 100 females, there were 95.0 males. For every 100 females age 18 and over, there were 90.8 males.

The median income for a household in the borough was $82,904, and the median income for a family was $90,861. Males had a median income of $65,052 versus $43,558 for females. The per capita income for the borough was $34,651. About 2.5% of families and 3.3% of the population were below the poverty line, including 2.9% of those under age 18 and 3.0% of those age 65 or over.

Parks and recreation

 Stonybrook Swim Club is a pool complex located on Cedar Lane that includes an Olympic-size swimming pool, kiddie pool, intermediate pool, water slide, picnic area, basketball court, and playground.
 Beechwood Park, located on Hillsdale Avenue, has an amphitheater, playground, picnic area, and a softball field. In 2014, a group of 70 residents, assisted by a $1,000 grant, worked to rebuild and expand walking trails that run through the park.
 Hillsdale Memorial Park, located across from Beechwood Park has baseball fields and basketball courts.
 Hillsdale has several recreational sports including basketball, baseball, softball, soccer, lacrosse, and football.

Government

Local government
Hillsdale is governed under the Borough form of New Jersey municipal government, which is used in 218 municipalities (of the 564) statewide, making it the most common form of government in New Jersey. The governing body is comprised of a Mayor and a Borough Council, with all positions elected at-large on a partisan basis as part of the November general election. A Mayor is elected directly by the voters to a four-year term of office. The Borough Council is comprised of six members elected to serve three-year terms on a staggered basis, with two seats coming up for election each year in a three-year cycle. The Borough form of government used by Hillsdale is a "weak mayor / strong council" government in which council members act as the legislative body with the mayor presiding at meetings and voting only in the event of a tie. The mayor can veto ordinances subject to an override by a two-thirds majority vote of the council. The mayor makes committee and liaison assignments for council members, and most appointments are made by the mayor with the advice and consent of the council.

, the Mayor of Hillsdale is Republican John Ruocco, whose term of office ends December 31, 2023. Members of the Hillsdale Borough Council are Council President Janetta Trochimiuk (R, 2025), Anthony DeRosa (R, 2023), John Escobar (R, 2024), Justin P. Fox (R, 2025), Zoltan Horvath (R, 2023) and Abby Lundy (R, 2024).

After Douglas Frank resigned due to health issues, the council selected John Ruocco in September 2017 to replace him as mayor for the seat expiring in December 2019. The council chose Zoltan Horvath from three candidates nominated by the Republican municipal committee to fill Ruocco's vacant council seat expiring December 2017, while Frank Pizzella was selected to serve as council president through the end of the year.

Frank Pizzella was appointed in January 2013 to fill the vacant seat of Michael Giancarlo expiring in December 2013. Giancarlo's resignation in December 2012 was one of five that year, with Anthony DeRosa appointed in January 2012 to fill the seat of Donna Schiavone, Leslie Becker appointed to fill the vacancy of Jonathan DeJoseph when he was named as borough administrator, Frank Pizzella replacing Rod Capawana, and John MacEwen replacing the seat that Leslie Becker had briefly occupied.

Federal, state and county representation
Hillsdale is located in the 5th Congressional District and is part of New Jersey's 39th state legislative district.

Politics
As of March 2011, there were a total of 7,092 registered voters in Hillsdale, of which 1,694 (23.9% vs. 31.7% countywide) were registered as Democrats, 2,067 (29.1% vs. 21.1%) were registered as Republicans and 3,323 (46.9% vs. 47.1%) were registered as Unaffiliated. There were 8 voters registered as Libertarians or Greens. Among the borough's 2010 Census population, 69.4% (vs. 57.1% in Bergen County) were registered to vote, including 94.5% of those ages 18 and over (vs. 73.7% countywide).

In the 2016 presidential election, Republican Donald Trump received 2,836 votes (48.1% vs. 41.1% countywide), ahead of Democrat Hillary Clinton with 2,803 votes (47.6% vs. 54.2%) and other candidates with 252 votes (4.3% vs. 4.6%), among the 5,935 ballots cast by the borough's 7,768 registered voters, for a turnout of 76.4% (vs. 72.5% in Bergen County). In the 2012 presidential election, Republican Mitt Romney received 2,837 votes (51.2% vs. 43.5% countywide), ahead of Democrat Barack Obama with 2,610 votes (47.1% vs. 54.8%) and other candidates with 48 votes (0.9% vs. 0.9%), among the 5,537 ballots cast by the borough's 7,348 registered voters, for a turnout of 75.4% (vs. 70.4% in Bergen County). In the 2008 presidential election, Republican John McCain received 2,953 votes (50.4% vs. 44.5% countywide), ahead of Democrat Barack Obama with 2,814 votes (48.1% vs. 53.9%) and other candidates with 40 votes (0.7% vs. 0.8%), among the 5,854 ballots cast by the borough's 7,175 registered voters, for a turnout of 81.6% (vs. 76.8% in Bergen County). In the 2004 presidential election, Republican George W. Bush received 2,982 votes (52.7% vs. 47.2% countywide), ahead of Democrat John Kerry with 2,611 votes (46.2% vs. 51.7%) and other candidates with 48 votes (0.8% vs. 0.7%), among the 5,655 ballots cast by the borough's 6,879 registered voters, for a turnout of 82.2% (vs. 76.9% in the whole county).

In the 2013 gubernatorial election, Republican Chris Christie received 65.1% of the vote (2,262 cast), ahead of Democrat Barbara Buono with 34.0% (1,183 votes), and other candidates with 0.9% (31 votes), among the 3,536 ballots cast by the borough's 7,185 registered voters (60 ballots were spoiled), for a turnout of 49.2%. In the 2009 gubernatorial election, Republican Chris Christie received 2,034 votes (52.7% vs. 45.8% countywide), ahead of Democrat Jon Corzine with 1,561 votes (40.4% vs. 48.0%), Independent Chris Daggett with 225 votes (5.8% vs. 4.7%) and other candidates with 20 votes (0.5% vs. 0.5%), among the 3,860 ballots cast by the borough's 7,137 registered voters, yielding a 54.1% turnout (vs. 50.0% in the county).

Emergency services

Police
The Hillsdale Police Department has provided police services to the Borough of Hillsdale since 1921. As of 2023, there are a total of 22 members of the department: one chief, one captain, two detectives, 18 officers, in addition to three full-time and seven part-time dispatchers. The HPD is a full-time department funded by taxes. The force is responsible for all aspects of policing in the borough, including responding to fire and medical emergency calls. Each patrol car is equipped with a first aid kit, oxygen tank, and an Automated external defibrillator.

Officers of the Hillsdale Police Department are members of Hillsdale PBA Local 207 of the New Jersey State Policemen's Benevolent Association.

Fire
The Hillsdale Fire Department (HFD) is an all-volunteer fire department, started in 1902.https://hfpl.org/localhistory/Hillsdale_Fire_Dept_1902_1952.PDF Hillsdale Fire Department: Fifty Years of Service 1902-1952], Hillsdale Free Public Library. Accessed January 22, 2023.</ref> The department consists of one chief, one deputy chief, one Sr. captain, one captain, and four lieutenants. The department's headquarters is located at 383 Hillsdale Avenue, and houses two pumpers, Engine 34 and Engine 33; one tower ladder, Tower 31, and one rescue unit, Rescue 36. There is also a Fire chief's vehicle and a vehicle for the Assistant Chief.

Ambulance
The Hillsdale Volunteer Ambulance Service was established on January 5, 1954. The service is run by six officers: President, Vice President, Captain, lieutenant, secretary, and treasurer. The HVAS is an all-volunteer independent public emergency medical service. As such, they do not bill for services, and their equipment is not directly paid for by the borough. Funding is provided by donations and support from the borough. The service provides basic life support, and is staffed primarily by certified emergency medical technicians. They have one Type III ambulance, Ambulance 36.

The primary jurisdiction of the HVAS is the Borough of Hillsdale, but the service also regularly responds to requests for mutual-aid from the neighboring First Aid Squads of Old Tappan, Emerson, Washington Township, Westwood, River Vale, and Tri-Boro (Park Ridge, Woodcliff Lake, and Montvale).

The HVAS is a member of the New Jersey State First Aid Council, the Pascack Valley Volunteer Ambulance Association, and the Pascack Valley Mutual Aid Group, which includes organizations covering eight neighboring municipalities.

Education
The Hillsdale Public Schools serves students in pre-kindergarten through eighth grade. As of the 2018–19 school year, the district, comprised of three schools, had an enrollment of 1,147 students and 117.0 classroom teachers (on an FTE basis), for a student–teacher ratio of 9.8:1. Schools in the district (with 2018–19 enrollment data from the National Center for Education Statistics) are 
Ann Blanche Smith School with 317 students in Kindergarten through 4th grade, 
Meadowbrook Elementary School with 291 students in grades Pre-K–4 and 
George G. White Middle School with 531 students in grades 5–8.

Public school students in ninth through twelfth grades attend Pascack Valley High School along with students from neighboring River Vale. The school is part of the Pascack Valley Regional High School District, which also serves students from Montvale and Woodcliff Lake at Pascack Hills High School. During the 1994–1996 school years, Northern Valley Regional High School at Demarest was awarded the Blue Ribbon School Award of Excellence by the United States Department of Education. As of the 2018–2019 school year, the high school had an enrollment of 1,209 students and 92.6 classroom teachers (on an FTE basis), for a student–teacher ratio of 13.1:1.

Students from the borough, and all of Bergen County, are eligible to attend the secondary education programs offered by the Bergen County Technical Schools, which include the Bergen County Academies in Hackensack, and the Bergen Tech campus in Teterboro or Paramus. The district offers programs on a shared-time or full-time basis, with admission based on a selective application process and tuition covered by the student's home school district.

St. John's Academy is a Catholic school serving children in pre-kindergarten through eighth grade and operating under the auspices of the Roman Catholic Archdiocese of Newark. The school began as St. John the Baptist Parish School in 1955, and its current name was adopted in 1997 to reflect its collective sponsorship by St. John the Baptist, Hillsdale; St. Andrew's Church, Westwood; Our Lady Mother of the Church, Woodcliff Lake; St. Gabriel the Archangel, Saddle River; and Our Lady of Good Counsel, Washington Township.

Transportation

Roads and highways

County Route 503 (Kinderkamack Road) passes through Hillsdale. While the Garden State Parkway passes through Hillsdale, there is no interchange on the parkway within the borough.  It is accessible via nearby interchange 168.  The main east–west road in Hillsdale is Hillsdale Avenue, running nearly the length of the borough.  Other main roads in Hillsdale include Pascack Road, Broadway and Wierimus Road.

Public transportation
Hillsdale is served by NJ Transit at the Hillsdale train station, located at Broadway and Hillsdale Avenue, on the Pascack Valley Line, a single-track line with passing sidings providing service to and from Hoboken Terminal with connections via the Secaucus Junction transfer station to New York Penn Station and to other NJ Transit rail lines. Connections are available at Hoboken Terminal to other New Jersey Transit rail lines, the PATH train, New York Waterways ferry service to the World Financial Center and other destinations, along with Hudson-Bergen Light Rail service.

Rockland Coaches, a unit of Coach USA, provides bus service to the Port Authority Bus Terminal in Midtown Manhattan on their 11A, 46 and 47 routes from Stony Point, New York. Saddle River Tours provides service to the George Washington Bridge Bus Station on route 11C.

Notable people

People who were born in, residents of, or otherwise closely associated with Hillsdale include:

 Danny Aiello III (1957–2010), actor, stuntman and son of actor Danny Aiello
 Mary Jane Clark (born 1954), suspense novelist
 Tyler Cowen (born 1962), economist and author, who is an economics professor at George Mason University
 Olivia Dunne (born 2002), artistic gymnast who was a member of the USA national gymnastics team in 2017
 Reuben L. Haskell (1878–1971), U.S. Representative from New York's 10th congressional district from 1915 to 1919
 Buddy Hassett (1911–1997), professional baseball player who played first base in Major League Baseball from 1936 to 1942
 Marion West Higgins (1915–1999), first female Speaker of the New Jersey General Assembly
 Jeff Hostetler (born 1961), quarterback for the New York Giants' victory in Super Bowl XXV
 Charles Kaufman (1928–2016), music educator who taught at the Mannes School of Music from 1975 to 2002
 Johnny Kucks (1933–2013), pitcher who played for the New York Yankees and won the final game of the 1956 World Series
 Eddie Lopat (1918–1992), pitcher for the New York Yankees
 Tanner McEvoy (born 1993), wide receiver for the Seattle Seahawks
 Kathleen Noone (born 1945), soap opera/television actress
 David P. Patterson ( 1840–1879), president of the Hackensack and New York Railroad and early developer of Hillsdale.
 Jeff Phillips (born 1968), fitness trainer and former actor best known for his work in Guiding Light, As the World Turns and the 1996 film Independence Day
 Vic Raschi (1919–1988), pitcher for the New York Yankees
 David Remnick (born 1958), editor for The New Yorker
 Darren Rizzi (born 1970), assistant special teams coach for the Miami Dolphins
 Bob Schmetterer (born 1943), advertising executive
 Celita Schutz (born 1968), judoka who competed on the women's team in the 1996 Summer Olympics, in the 2000 Summer Olympics and in the 2004 Summer Olympics
 Bill Skowron (1930–2012), first baseman for the New York Yankees
 Benjamin Sommer (born 1964), Professor of Bible at The Jewish Theological Seminary of America and a Senior Fellow at the Shalom Hartman Institute"</ref>
 Mike Vaccaro, lead sports columnist for The New York Post since November 2002
 Jesse Van Saun (born 1976), retired soccer player who played professionally in Major League Soccer and USISL
 Teddy Wilson (1912–1986), jazz pianist
 Jerry Yellin (born 1924), former United States Army Air Forces fighter pilot, who flew the final combat mission of World War II

References

Sources

 Municipal Incorporations of the State of New Jersey (according to Counties) prepared by the Division of Local Government, Department of the Treasury (New Jersey); December 1, 1958.
 Clayton, W. Woodford; and Nelson, William. History of Bergen and Passaic Counties, New Jersey, with Biographical Sketches of Many of its Pioneers and Prominent Men. Philadelphia: Everts and Peck, 1882.
 Harvey, Cornelius Burnham (ed.), Genealogical History of Hudson and Bergen Counties, New Jersey. New York: New Jersey Genealogical Publishing Co., 1900.
 Van Valen, James M. History of Bergen County, New Jersey. New York: New Jersey Publishing and Engraving Co., 1900.
 Westervelt, Frances A. (Frances Augusta), 1858–1942, History of Bergen County, New Jersey, 1630–1923, Lewis Historical Publishing Company, 1923.

External links

 
 Greater Pascack Valley Chamber of Commerce website

 
1898 establishments in New Jersey
1923 establishments in New Jersey
Borough form of New Jersey government
Boroughs in Bergen County, New Jersey
Pascack Valley
Populated places established in 1898
Populated places established in 1923